Seasick Sailor is a 2013 horror and dramatic short film from Torre Catalano. It stars Keir Gilchrist, Martha MacIsaac, Fran Kranz, Martin Starr, Emily Osment, Brandon Jay McLaren, Steven Bauer and Al Sapienza. The film premiered at the Williamsburg Independent Film Festival on November 22, 2013.

Premise 
A lonely teenager working as a "debt collector" for an underground gambling ring in Los Angeles, desperately tries to fit in with a new group of friends while balancing the responsibilities of his job.

Cast
Keir Gilchrist as Penna
Martha MacIsaac as The Girl
Fran Kranz as Wormy Guy
Martin Starr as Bookbinder
Emily Osment as Beck
Brandon Jay McLaren as Big Guy
Steven Bauer as Waldorf
Al Sapienza as Lou

Awards and nominations

References

External links
 
 

2013 films
American horror short films
2010s horror drama films
American horror drama films
2013 short films
2013 drama films
2010s English-language films
2010s American films